Joseph B. Spencer Jr. (August 4, 1919 – May 17, 2003) was an American Negro league second baseman in the 1940s.

A native of Gretna, Louisiana, Spencer attended Xavier College in New Orleans, Louisiana. He made his Negro leagues debut in 1942 with the Birmingham Black Barons, and played for the Homestead Grays during their Negro World Series championship 1943 and 1944 seasons. In 1946, he played for the Seattle Steelheads of the short-lived West Coast Negro Baseball Association, and finished his Negro league career with the New York Black Yankees in 1947 and 1948.

Following his Negro league career, he spent five seasons in minor league baseball, including the 1951 season when he played for the Elmwood Giants of the Mandak League. Spencer died in Gretna in 2003 at age 83.

References

External links
 and Baseball-Reference Black Baseball stats and Seamheads
 Joseph B. Spencer Jr. at Negro League Baseball Players Association

1919 births
2003 deaths
Baltimore Elite Giants players
Birmingham Black Barons players
Homestead Grays players
New York Black Yankees players
New York Cubans players
Newark Eagles players
People from Gretna, Louisiana
Baseball players from Louisiana
Baseball second basemen
20th-century African-American sportspeople
21st-century African-American people